Bilateral relations exist between Armenia and Croatia. Diplomatic relations between the countries were established on 8 July 1996. Armenia is represented in Croatia by its embassy in Rome, Italy, while Croatia is represented in Armenia by its embassy in Athens, Greece. In 2011, both countries have established honorary consulates, Armenia's residing in Zagreb, while Croatia's residing in Yerevan, the capitals of the respective countries.

Armenia is a member of the Eurasian Economic Union (ECU), while Croatia is a member of the European Union (EU). Though, Armenia is a signatory of the European Union Association Agreement.

History 
Republic of Ragusa in present-day Dubrovnik was a center of Croatian-Armenian historical connections. Amongst many foreigners that inhabited Dubrovnik was a number of Armenians. Also, Ragusans celebrate Saint Blaise, a fourth century Armenian saint from Sivas as a patron-saint of their city. Also, other two patron saints of Dubrovnik, Zenobios and Zenobia, were Armenian saints from Cilicia, and Ragusans also observe a cult of the Forty Martyrs of Sebaste. Ragusan bishop Raimondo Gallani was archbishop of Ankara and apostolic Vicar of Istanbul at the beginning of the 18th century. Gallani corresponded with Mkhitar Sebastatsi, the founder of the well-known Mekhitarist Order. The Ragusans cared for  Catholics in the Ottoman Empire, including those in Armenia.

A Croatian Jesuit from Perast, Father Josip Marinović, wrote Dissertazione polemico-critica sopra due dubbi di coscienza concernenti gli armeni cattolici, in 1783, at the request of a wealthy Armenian banker, Giovanni de Serpos. In the dissertation, Marinović defends Armenian Catholics in the Ottoman Empire who received the sacraments from the Monophysite Armenian Apostolic Church, which part of the clergy in Rome disapproved. Marinović wrote that Armenians had papal approval for performing rites in monophysite churches, as well as attending an Armenian rite mass, giving to charities, and observing holidays based on the Armenian calendar.

During a theological debate, Marinović wrote a three-volume work with more than 1,600 pages titled Compendino storico di memorie cronologiche concernenti la religione e la morale della nazione Armena, which was to be the first modern history of Armenians written in the West. In his work, Marinović wrote about Armenian geography, a review of a political and church history of Armenia, the history of their catholicoi and synods, and a review of Armenian customs and other political and religious matters.

Marinović's work influenced a final political and ecclesiastical solution to the problem of Armenian Catholics. With help from the Austrian and Russian Empire, the Vatican gained a recognition of Armenian Catholics in the Ottoman Empire and founded their Archeparchy in Istanbul in 1830. Marinović's work laid a foundation for modern research of Armenian history.

Mekhitarists in Vienna, present-day Austria, published some 200 books in Croatian in the humanities and natural sciences. They also published a Croatian nationalist political journal Novi pozor between 1867 and 1869. Among notable Croatian authors whose books were published by the Michtarists in Vienna were Vjekoslav Babukić, Dimitrija Demeter, Juraj Haulik, Vjekoslav Klaić, Antun Mažuranić, Matija Mesić, Ilija Okrugić, Josip Juraj Strossmayer, Bogoslav Šulek, Josip Torbar and others.

Armenian genocide 

Croats share deep sympathy with Armenians in the aftermath of the Armenian genocide even when Croatia has not recognized the genocide. It is noted that the genocide is carefully studied and distributed in Croatia, which prompted Turkish Government to demand the Croatian Government removing the content of Armenian Genocide. Zagreb refused the offer.

Representation 

Armenia recognised Croatia as an independent country on 21 June 1994, while diplomatic relations between the countries were established on 8 July 1996. Armenia is represented in Croatia by its embassy in Rome, Italy Croatia is represented in Armenia by its embassy in Athens, Greece,  Both countries have honorary consulates.

Agreements 

Armenia and Croatia have signed three agreements and one protocol:

Trade

High level visits

See also 

 Armenia–EU relations 
 Armenians in Croatia 
 Croats in Armenia
 Foreign relations of Armenia
 Foreign relations of Croatia

References

Notes

Journals

News reports

Other sources 

 
 
 
 
 

 
Croatia
Bilateral relations of Croatia